Picrasma is a genus of flowering plants in the family Simaroubaceae, comprising six to nine species native to temperate to tropical regions of Asia, and tropical regions of the Americas. The species are shrubs and trees growing up to 20 m tall.

Selected species
Picrasma chinensis 
Picrasma crenata 
Picrasma excelsa 
Picrasma javanica 
Picrasma mexicana 
Picrasma quassioides

References

 
Sapindales genera
Taxonomy articles created by Polbot